The JW Marriott Hotel Hong Kong is a hotel of JW Marriott Hotels. It is located in the Admiralty area of Hong Kong, on the border of Wan Chai and Central, on Hong Kong Island. The hotel opened on 27 February 1989 in the Pacific Place complex. It is the first Asian and flagship hotel of the Marriott Hotel Group. It was the first hotel in Hong Kong to have a five-day workweek for its associates. 36/F to 50/F was redeveloped into Upper House, formerly a service apartment for international staff, now a delicate luxury hotel managed by Swire Properties since September 2009.

History 
JW Marriott Hotel Hong Kong was opened in the first phase of development of Pacific Place, a complex of office towers, hotels and a shopping centre situated at 88 Queensway, in Admiralty, Hong Kong. The hotel was part of phase one out of three, the second phase opened in 1991, and the final third phase in 2004.

Pacific Place contains three other luxury hotels, the Island Shangri-La, the Conrad Hong Kong, and the Upper House respectively. The complex is directly connected to Admiralty station, part of Hong Kong's MTR that opened in 1979 and is located in Admiralty, at the eastern extension of Hong Kong's central business district.

Awards
The hotel won the 2000 Best Business Hotel in Hong Kong award from Business Asia.

See also
 Upper House
 JW Marriott Kuala Lumpur
 JW Marriott Shanghai

References

External links

JW Marriott Hong Kong
JW Marriott Shanghai
Great Hotels of the World

JW Marriott Hotels
Central, Hong Kong
Landmarks in Hong Kong
Hotels in Hong Kong
Skyscraper hotels in Hong Kong
Hotel buildings completed in 1989